William Artis (3 October 1884 – 23 June 1957) was a British sports shooter. He competed in the 50 m rifle event at the 1924 Summer Olympics.

References

External links
 

1884 births
1957 deaths
British male sport shooters
Olympic shooters of Great Britain
Shooters at the 1924 Summer Olympics
People from Wangford